Chelis marinae is a moth of the family Erebidae. It was described by Vladimir Viktorovitch Dubatolov in 1985. It is found in Russia (the Terektinskii and Kuraiskii mountain ranges).

This species was formerly a member of the genus Holoarctia, but was moved to Chelis along with the other species of the genera Holoarctia, Neoarctia, and Hyperborea.

References

 

Arctiina
Moths described in 1985